Carex thouarsii is a species of sedge found in the Tristan da Cunha archipelago. It lives chiefly in heaths dominated by Blechnum palmiforme, and Phylica arborea woodland. It is widespread and common on Tristan da Cunha and Inaccessible Island, but scarce on Nightingale Island, possibly due to a lack of habitat. It was first described by Dugald Carmichael in 1819 following the British annexation of Tristan da Cunha in 1816.

References

External links

thouarsii
Flora of Tristan da Cunha
Plants described in 1819
Least concern plants
Taxonomy articles created by Polbot